Shane Schuller (born 17 June 1994), known by the stage name RiskyKidd, is a Greek rapper. He was born in London to a German father and a Jamaican mother and later moved to Greece. In 2014, he was chosen to represent Greece in the Eurovision Song Contest 2014 along with Freaky Fortune with the song "Rise Up".. Currently Riskykidd is an independent Artist, releasing his music through the joint venture with Gio Melody, Melody Gang with an upcoming album titled "I Am Risky II".

Discography

Videos 
 2012: "Party all the time"
 2013: "Good Life" (feat. The Hype)
 2014: "Radio ft. Josephine"
 2014: "Rise Up" Freaky Fortune Feat Riskykidd
 2015: "Lonely"
 2015: "I want to live"
 2016: "Bang"
 2016: "Fire to the night"3
 2018: "Diamonds"
 2019: "Never Be Stopped ft. Gio Melody, YT"
 2020: "KP with the Stunnaz"

Singles
 2012: "All the Time" (with Playmen, Elena Paparizou and Courtney)
 2013: "Rhythm Is a Dancer" (with HouseTwins and Courtney)
 2013: "Angel" Alex Leon feat Giorgina (euro song contest 2013 )
 2013: "The Sun" Demy feat epsilon and Alex Leon
 2013: "I can't breathe" Κώστας Μαρτάκης feat Χριστίνα Σάλτη
 2013: "Radio" Lunatic Feat. RiskyKidd & Josephine
 2014: "Rise Up" (with Freaky Fortune)
 2015: ″Lonely″ featuring Drew
 2015: "I want to live" 
 2016: "Bang"
 2016: "Fire to the night"
 2016: "All my people"
 2016: "Hollywood"
 2016: "Lies" feat Gio Melody
 2016: "Like Me"
 2016: "Moments" feat Gio Melody
 2016: "Truth"
 2016: "Xxxx"
 2018: "Diamonds"
 2020: "Kp with the Stunnaz"
 2020: "Gio Melody - Never Be Stopped ft. Riskykidd & YT"
 2021: "Demise"

Albums:

 I Am Risky
(2016)
 I Am Risky II
(Date TBA)

References 

1994 births
Living people
Greek rappers
Eurovision Song Contest entrants for Greece
Eurovision Song Contest entrants of 2014
Greek people of German descent
Greek people of Jamaican descent